The Bruce School was built in the east part of the Brant district and named after Joseph Bruce, the first local settlers. It was organized in 1884 and built soon after on SW 1/4 3-14-1E. This was located 2 miles east and 3 miles north of the present Argyle Village.

Bruce School #170 
$600 was spent on construction materials  and construction was done by local citizens who had children to attend the school. The school was unique in Manitoba's Interlake region, as it was made of field stone, whereas most one room schools of the period were made of wood, so they could be moved if populations within the school district changed.

When the Bruce School district was dissolved in 1913, half the students went north to Balmoral and the remainder attended the Brant Consolidated School in Argyle Station (Argyle village) The other two one room schools to join Bruce at the Brant Consolidated school that same year were McLeod and Brant Schools.

References 
 http://www.settlersrailsandtrails.com (Settlers,Rails & Trails Inc)
 Rockwood 100 Years of History (book)
 Hands Across the Meridian, History of Brant-Argyle, Manitoba

Elementary schools in Manitoba
Educational institutions established in 1884
1884 establishments in Manitoba